Manrique Alonso Lallave also known as Fr. Nicolás Manrique Alonso Lallave was a Spanish Dominican priest well known for translating the Gospel of Luke into the Pangasinan language, the first ever known instance of a part of the Bible translated into a Philippine language.

Biography

Early life 
Not much is known about Lallave's early life, he was born on February 14, 1839, in the small village of La Fuente de San Esteban, near the border of Portugal and Spain, at age 14, he entered a convent of the Dominican overseas missionaries. He finished his studies in Manila and served as a Roman Catholic pastor for 12 years in the Philippine Islands.

Conversion to Protestantism 
He seems to have converted to Protestantism while in Pangasinan as the Spanish Dominican priest he received an English Bible from a British captain, and/or by Protestant treaties that someone had sent him from London, which caused a change causing his preachings to become "Protestant," then in 1867, Someone sent him Protestant treaties from Spain, which motivated him to be demoted and locked in a dungeon in a convent in Manila, He wrote about his conversion: “My somewhat extensive knowledge of religion has come to persuade me of the many and far-reaching mistakes of the Church of Rome, from which I have separated, freely and spontaneously, with no other purpose than to profess the truth, and using the anti-evangelical behavior of the Roman clergy in general and of the friars in particular” as a motive.

Later life 

Because of his Protestantism, In 1872, he was removed from his position as priest and sent back to Spain where he renounced Catholicism and joined a Protestant church called the Spanish Christian Church and began his ministry in the evangelical churches of Granada and Madrid in different periods, being a pastor established in Seville from 1874 to 1888.

in 1873, he translated the Gospel of Luke into the Pangasinan language, which was the first instance of a part of the Bible translated into a Philippine language, it was then published in 1877 by the British and Foreign Bible Society

In Seville he became a Mason, in the Numancia 16 lodge of the Gran Oriente Luso in 1886 of the Great East Luso by 1886, being Master Founder. Later he would found Numancia 67 of the Gran Logia Sevillana and will be director of El taller, a freemason newspaper

In 1877, He became a Protestant pastor. He nearly finished translating the New Testament, married Carolina Ortíz Morilla, together they had seven children

Death 

He passed by Madrid to see his translation printed, on March 30, 1889, Lallave went to Manila, planning to distribute his translated Bibles with F. de P. Castells, a young Catalan Protestant pastor, and because they wanted to check if his aforementioned translation in Panganisan had arrived, create a Protestant church in the Philippines and establish an agency of the British and Foreign Bible Society, shortly afterwards they both got sick, Lallave died and got buried, while Castells recovered and then was released from jail through the British consul's intercession, on condition that he leave the Islands immediately, according to some sources and Castell, Lallave and Castells were poisoned, this was then backed up when Lallave's daughter then claimed that 2 months after her fathers death, his family received a cable and doctor's note saying that Lallave died from a fever and that his last word's were about his family, 2 messages from Manila to the family claimed that he was poisoned.

Personal life 
He married Carolina Ortíz Morilla in 1887, together they had 7 children.

Notes

References 

1839 births
1889 deaths
Spanish Dominicans
Spanish priests
People from Salamanca